Platymantis guentheri is a species of frog in the family Ceratobatrachidae.
It is endemic to the Philippines, where it occurs in the rainforests of Leyte, Biliran, Maripipi, Bohol, Panglao, Dinagat, and Mindanao islands. Its natural habitats are subtropical or tropical moist lowland forest, subtropical or tropical moist montane forest, plantations, rural gardens, and heavily degraded former forest. It is threatened by habitat loss.

References

Guentheri
Amphibians of the Philippines
Endemic fauna of the Philippines
Taxonomy articles created by Polbot
Amphibians described in 1882